The Tonic 23 is a French trailerable sailboat, that was designed by Philippe Harlé as a coastal cruiser and first built in 1985.

Production
The design was built by Jeanneau in France from 1985 until 1992, but it is now out of production. During its production run about 750 boats were completed.

Design

The Tonic 23 is a recreational keelboat, built predominantly of monolithic polyester fiberglass, with wood trim. The deck includes a balsawood core. It has a fractional sloop rig with a deck-stepped aluminium mast with a single set of swept-back spreaders, a raked stem, a vertical transom, a transom-hung rudder controlled by tiller and a fixed fin keel or optionally a stub keel and centerboard. The fixed keel version displaces  and carries  of cast iron ballast, while the stub keel and centerboard version displaces  and carries  of cast iron exterior ballast with the centerboard made from steel.

The boat is normally fitted with a small  outboard motor for docking and maneuvering or optionally an inboard motor could be installed.

The design has sleeping accommodation for four people, with a double "V"-berth in the bow cabin, with a drop-down dinette table and an aft cabin with a double berth on the port side. The galley is located on the port side just forward of the companionway ladder. The galley is "L"-shaped and is equipped with a stove, icebox and a sink. A navigation station is opposite the galley, on the starboard side. The enclosed head is located on the starboard side at the companionway.

Operational history
In a 2010 review Steve Henkel wrote, "best features: Comparing statistics among the comps, the 5' 7" headroom featured in the Tonic pops right out. Also a plus is her beam ... To our knowledge, the Tonic is not known for her speed, so her average PHRF rating of 225 seems low to us ... Worst features: The Tonic’s iron keel will require regular maintenance to keep from weeping rust."

See also
List of sailing boat types

Similar sailboats
Achilles 24
Atlantic City catboat
Balboa 24
C&C 24
Islander 24
Islander 24 Bahama
MacGregor 24
Mirage 24
Nutmeg 24
San Juan 24
Seidelmann 245
Shark 24

References

External links

Keelboats
1980s sailboat type designs
Sailing yachts
Trailer sailers
Sailboat type designs by Philippe Harlé
Sailboat types built by Jeanneau